Staroselye is the name of several rural localities in Russia.

Belgorod Oblast
As of 2010, one rural locality in Belgorod Oblast bears this name:
Staroselye, Belgorod Oblast, a selo in Krasnoyaruzhsky District

Bryansk Oblast
As of 2010, two rural localities in Bryansk Oblast bear this name:
Staroselye, Bryansky District, Bryansk Oblast, a village in Otradnensky Selsoviet of Bryansky District
Staroselye, Unechsky District, Bryansk Oblast, a selo in Staroselsky Selsoviet of Unechsky District

Kaliningrad Oblast
As of 2010, one rural locality in Kaliningrad Oblast bears this name:
Staroselye, Kaliningrad Oblast, a settlement in Gvardeysky Rural Okrug of Bagrationovsky District

Kaluga Oblast
As of 2010, four rural localities in Kaluga Oblast bear this name:
Staroselye, Kozelsky District, Kaluga Oblast, a village in Kozelsky District
Staroselye, Maloyaroslavetsky District, Kaluga Oblast, a village in Maloyaroslavetsky District
Staroselye, Meshchovsky District, Kaluga Oblast, a village in Meshchovsky District
Staroselye, Sukhinichsky District, Kaluga Oblast, a village in Sukhinichsky District

Leningrad Oblast
As of 2010, two rural localities in Leningrad Oblast bear this name:
Staroselye, Tosnensky District, Leningrad Oblast, a village in Shapkinskoye Settlement Municipal Formation of Tosnensky District
Staroselye, Vyborgsky District, Leningrad Oblast, a logging depot settlement in Krasnoselskoye Settlement Municipal Formation of Vyborgsky District

Moscow Oblast
As of 2010, one rural locality in Moscow Oblast bears this name:
Staroselye, Moscow Oblast, a village in Filimonkovskoye Rural Settlement of Leninsky District

Nizhny Novgorod Oblast
As of 2010, one rural locality in Nizhny Novgorod Oblast bears this name:
Staroselye, Nizhny Novgorod Oblast, a village in Dubravsky Selsoviet of Dalnekonstantinovsky District

Novgorod Oblast
As of 2010, two rural localities in Novgorod Oblast bear this name:
Staroselye, Borovichsky District, Novgorod Oblast, a village in Yegolskoye Settlement of Borovichsky District
Staroselye, Pestovsky District, Novgorod Oblast, a village in Pestovskoye Settlement of Pestovsky District

Pskov Oblast
As of 2010, eight rural localities in Pskov Oblast bear this name:
Staroselye (Zhizhitskaya Rural Settlement), Kunyinsky District, Pskov Oblast, a village in Kunyinsky District; municipally, a part of Zhizhitskaya Rural Settlement of that district
Staroselye (Kaskovskaya Rural Settlement), Kunyinsky District, Pskov Oblast, a village in Kunyinsky District; municipally, a part of Kaskovskaya Rural Settlement of that district
Staroselye (Botalovskaya Rural Settlement), Kunyinsky District, Pskov Oblast, a village in Kunyinsky District; municipally, a part of Botalovskaya Rural Settlement of that district
Staroselye, Loknyansky District, Pskov Oblast, a village in Loknyansky District
Staroselye, Nevelsky District, Pskov Oblast, a village in Nevelsky District
Staroselye, Novorzhevsky District, Pskov Oblast, a village in Novorzhevsky District
Staroselye, Opochetsky District, Pskov Oblast, a village in Opochetsky District
Staroselye, Palkinsky District, Pskov Oblast, a village in Palkinsky District

Smolensk Oblast
As of 2010, ten rural localities in Smolensk Oblast bear this name:
Staroselye, Dorogobuzhsky District, Smolensk Oblast, a village in Usvyatskoye Rural Settlement of Dorogobuzhsky District
Staroselye, Dukhovshchinsky District, Smolensk Oblast, a village in Beresnevskoye Rural Settlement of Dukhovshchinsky District
Staroselye, Gagarinsky District, Smolensk Oblast, a village in Karmanovskoye Rural Settlement of Gagarinsky District
Staroselye, Kostyrevskoye Rural Settlement, Roslavlsky District, Smolensk Oblast, a village in Kostyrevskoye Rural Settlement of Roslavlsky District
Staroselye, Prigoryevskoye Rural Settlement, Roslavlsky District, Smolensk Oblast, a village in Prigoryevskoye Rural Settlement of Roslavlsky District
Staroselye, Ugransky District, Smolensk Oblast, a village in Slobodskoye Rural Settlement of Ugransky District
Staroselye, Velizhsky District, Smolensk Oblast, a village in Zaozerskoye Rural Settlement of Velizhsky District
Staroselye, Vyazemsky District, Smolensk Oblast, a village in Kasnyanskoye Rural Settlement of Vyazemsky District
Staroselye, Miropolskoye Rural Settlement, Yartsevsky District, Smolensk Oblast, a village in Miropolskoye Rural Settlement of Yartsevsky District
Staroselye, Podroshchinskoye Rural Settlement, Yartsevsky District, Smolensk Oblast, a village in Podroshchinskoye Rural Settlement of Yartsevsky District

Tula Oblast
As of 2010, one rural locality in Tula Oblast bears this name:
Staroselye, Tula Oblast, a village in Ivanovsky Rural Okrug of Belyovsky District

Tver Oblast
As of 2010, nine rural localities in Tver Oblast bear this name:
Staroselye, Bezhetsky District, Tver Oblast, a village in Bezhetsky District
Staroselye, Kalininsky District, Tver Oblast, a village in Kalininsky District
Staroselye, Kashinsky District, Tver Oblast, a village in Kashinsky District
Staroselye (Vysokinskoye Rural Settlement), Nelidovsky District, Tver Oblast, a village in Nelidovsky District; municipally, a part of Vysokinskoye Rural Settlement of that district
Staroselye (Novoselkovskoye Rural Settlement), Nelidovsky District, Tver Oblast, a village in Nelidovsky District; municipally, a part of Novoselkovskoye Rural Settlement of that district
Staroselye, Oleninsky District, Tver Oblast, a village in Oleninsky District
Staroselye (Kurovskoye Rural Settlement), Udomelsky District, Tver Oblast, a village in Udomelsky District; municipally, a part of Kurovskoye Rural Settlement of that district
Staroselye (Kotlovanskoye Rural Settlement), Udomelsky District, Tver Oblast, a village in Udomelsky District; municipally, a part of Kotlovanskoye Rural Settlement of that district
Staroselye, Zapadnodvinsky District, Tver Oblast, a village in Zapadnodvinsky District

Volgograd Oblast
As of 2010, one rural locality in Volgograd Oblast bears this name:
Staroselye, Volgograd Oblast, a selo in Bezymyansky Selsoviet of Mikhaylovsky District

Yaroslavl Oblast
As of 2010, three rural localities in Yaroslavl Oblast bear this name:
Staroselye, Borisoglebsky District, Yaroslavl Oblast, a village in Shchurovsky Rural Okrug of Borisoglebsky District
Staroselye (settlement), Rybinsky District, Yaroslavl Oblast, a settlement in Nazarovsky Rural Okrug of Rybinsky District
Staroselye (village), Rybinsky District, Yaroslavl Oblast, a village in Nazarovsky Rural Okrug of Rybinsky District